The 2015–16 season is Motherwell's thirty-first consecutive season in the top flight of Scottish football and the third in the newly established Scottish Premiership, having been promoted from the Scottish First Division at the end of the 1984–85 season. Motherwell will also compete in the League Cup and the Scottish Cup.

Important Events
On 12 June 2015, Motherwell announced their first batch of Pre-season Friendlies.

On 23 September 2015, Motherwell parted ways with manager Ian Baraclough.

On 13 October 2015, Mark McGhee returned to the club as manager.

Results & Fixtures

Pre-season Friendlies

Scottish Premiership

Scottish Cup

Scottish League Cup

Squad statistics

Appearances

|-
|colspan="14"|Players away from the club on loan:
|-
|colspan="14"|Players who left Motherwell during the season:

|}

Goal scorers

Disciplinary record

Awards

Manager of the Month

Team statistics

League table

Results by round

Results summary

Results by opponent
Motherwell score first

Source: 2015–16 Scottish Premier League Results Table

Transfers

In

Out

Loans in

Loans out

Released

See also
 List of Motherwell F.C. seasons

Notes

References

External links
 Motherwell F.C. Website
 BBC My Club Page
 Motherwell F.C. Newsnow

Motherwell F.C. seasons
Motherwell